Klaus R. Dittrich (30 December 1950 – 20 November 2007) was a German computer scientist.

Biography 
After his high school graduation at Gymnasium Münchberg he studied at University of Karlsruhe where he received his diploma degree (M.Sc.) in Computer Science.

1982 he earned his Ph.D. at Universität Karlsruhe, Institute for Program Structures and Data Organization. He was heading the database department Research Center for Information Technologies at University of Karlsruhe from 1985 to 1989.

Since 1989 he has been a professor of Computer Science at the University of Zurich and head of the Database Technology Research Group.

Klaus R. Dittrich took sabbatical leaves at Stanford University and Hewlett Packard Labs (1996), at Università degli Studi di Milano and at Boeing (2002). 1999 he was guest professor at Aalborg University.

References 

1950 births
2007 deaths
German computer scientists